Chak Malook is a village and union council, an administrative subdivision, of Chakwal District in the Punjab Province of Pakistan, it is part of Chakwal Tehsil, and is located at 32°58'0N 72°57'0E.

References

Union councils of Chakwal District
Populated places in Chakwal District